Ptilostemon is a genus of plants in the tribe Cardueae within the family Asteraceae.

 Species

References

External links
 

Cynareae
Asteraceae genera